Shelgaon may refer to:
Shelgaon (Chakur), a village in Udgir tahisil, Latur district, Maharashtra, India
Shelgaon Hatkar,  a village in Parbhani district, Maharashtra, India
Shelgaon (K), a village in Solapur district, Maharashtra, India
Shelgaon Maratha,  a village in Parbhani district, Maharashtra, India
Shelgaon Rajgure, a village in Washim district, Maharashtra, India
Shelgaon (Wangi), a village in Solapur district, Maharashtra, India